The KCHT Power Station is a municipal solid waste-fired thermal power station currently under construction at Muthurajawela in Sri Lanka. It is being constructed together with the Aitken Spence Power Station, after it won the bid by the Urban Development Authority from a pool of 121 bidders, 19 of which were foreign.

It will use  of waste from the Colombo and Gampaha suburbs. The generated power will be sold to the state-owned Ceylon Electricity Board at a rate of  generated. The remaining bottom ash resulting from the process would be used for road construction and other purposes, while the unusable fly ash residue (amounting to 2%) being disposed at locations already identified.

See also 
 List of power stations in Sri Lanka
 Muthurajawela wetlands

References

External links 
 
 
 

Fossil fuel power stations in Sri Lanka